Marion Gibbs Galland (November 18, 1913 – August 5, 2007) was an American civic activist, housewife and Democratic politician who became the first woman to represent Alexandria, Virginia in the Virginia General Assembly. Elected in 1963, she served three consecutive terms in the Virginia House of Delegates, from 1964 to 1970.

Early and family life
Born in Montvale, New Jersey, Marion Gibbs attended Vassar College then Barnard College from which she graduated in 1936. She married George Galland, and they had children who survived them.

Career
In 1964, Marion Galland joined Kathryn H. Stone and Dorothy Shoemaker McDiarmid, both also from northern Virginia, in the Virginia General Assembly. Northern Virginia delegates had litigated the voting apportionment case Davis v. Mann, and the United States Supreme Court ruled in their favor in 1964. In the subsequent reapportionment, Alexandria gained a seat, so Galland served alongside conservative James M. Thomson, whose father-in-law was U.S. Senator Harry F. Byrd, one of the principal architects of Massive Resistance against the Supreme Court's school desegregation decision in Brown v. Board of Education.

Described as a "four foot, 11-inch dynamo" who "probably weighed less than 95 pounds soaking wet," by a later successor, state senator Patsy Ticer, Galland was active in the League of Women Voters and Association of American University Women, and later became the first President of Alexandria Senior Services (1968) and of the Alexandria Community Y (which became the Campagna Center)(1971–74). She also served on the boards of trustees of the Alexandria Mental Hygiene Clinic, Alexandria Community Health Center, Virginia Mental Health Association, Alexandria Health and Welfare Council and the Washington Area Health and Welfare Council, as well as the Democratic State Central Committee. Galland was also active in the Alexandria Parent Teacher Association, St. Paul's Episcopal Church, Church Women United, the Business and Professional Women's Club, WETA, Planned Parenthood, the Hunting Creek Garden Club, the Salvation Army Auxiliary, Urban League, Association for Childhood Education, the Northern Virginia Association for Retarded Children, Human Relations council, Washington Area United Givers Fund, Alexandria Red Cross, and the National Symphony Women's Committee.

Death and legacy

Galland spent her final years in Goodwin House, where she had previously volunteered, and died on August 5, 2007. Her family requested that rather than flowers, donations be made to the Campagna Center, the successor to organizations she had helped found.

References

1913 births
2007 deaths
Democratic Party members of the Virginia House of Delegates
Barnard College alumni
20th-century American politicians
People from Montvale, New Jersey
Politicians from Alexandria, Virginia
20th-century American women politicians
Women state legislators in Virginia